David Teniers may refer to three Flemish artists, father, son, and grandson:
David Teniers the Elder (1582–1649), turned from large religious paintings to landscapes and genre scenes
David Teniers the Younger (1610–1690), the most famous of the three, especially noted for genre scenes of peasant life 
David Teniers III (1638–1685), who painted scenes similar to his father's